The 12th Missile Squadron is a United States Air Force unit.  It is assigned to the 341st Operations Group, stationed at Malmstrom Air Force Base, Montana.   The squadron is equipped with the LGM-30G Minuteman III intercontinental ballistic missile, with a mission of nuclear deterrence.

Mission
The mission of the 341st Missile Wing is to provide combat-ready people and aerospace forces.

History

World War II

The 12th Bombardment Squadron was organized and activated at Langley Field, Virginia on 1 February 1940, as a member of the 25th Bombardment Group. The unit moved from Langley where it trained initially, to Borinquen Field, Puerto Rico, where it became part of Caribbean Air Force on 1 November 1940.  Following the initial deployment to Puerto Rico. The squadron participated in various training and familiarization flights with its small complement of Douglas B-18 Bolo medium bombers, until 8 November 1941 when it was ordered to deploy to Benedict Field, St. Croix, temporarily until September 1942, then at St. Nicholas, and Antigua.

Following the Pearl Harbor Attack, the squadron commenced operations out of Benedict with its tiny force of three B-18s. However, these were exchanged for four slightly more capable B-18As by 16 January 1942. By mid-February, these had been augmented by a further B-18 (while one of the B-18As was away at the Mobile Air Depot being fitted with one of the earliest airborne radar systems) and the squadron had a total of four crews, three of whom had more than 12 months experience.  Operations continued out of Benedict Field until 10 October 1942, when it moved to Dakota Field, Aruba, and the following month came under the operational control of the Antilles Air Task Force and VI Fighter Command. By 11 December, the unit had six B-18Bs and four Douglas A-20A Havocs while Flight D of the squadron was at distant Borinquen Field with two further B-18Bs and a B-18.  Apparently this aircraft dispersal proved too much for the unit to handle and, by January 1943, strength on report had dropped to a more reasonable total of just five B-18Bs and a single B-18C at Dakota Field, although Flight D remained at Borinquen as late as June, and Flight C moved from Dakota to Rio Hato Field, Panama, from 1 June till 20 July 1943. In addition, several 59th Bombardment Squadron aircraft were attached to the 12th at this point, as were two Bell P-39D Airacobras of the 22d Pursuit Squadron.

All of this shuffling of aircraft was due, of course, to the exigencies of the antisubmarine campaign, which had been re-initiated in early January 1943.  By October 1943, operational control of the now very experienced unit had passed to Commander, All Forces, Aruba and Curaçao (CAFAC), and the United States Navy assumed command and the unit, together with the Lockheed PV-1 Venturas of a Navy unit there provided continuous coverage for, amongst others, convoy GAT94 and its route from the time it entered the area.

As the anti-submarine war continuously shifted, the squadron moved to follow, leaving Dakota Field on 23 November to move to Coolidge Field on Antigua, at which time its attachment to CAFAC ended. While there, it provided continuous coverage for Convoy TAG95. By the end of December, the unit had started to reequip, and had two of the B-18Bs, but also three North American B-25D Mitchells and not fewer than 12 B-25Gs at Coolidge.

As the antisubmarine campaign eased, the unit became, essentially, a crew training outfit, although patrols were still flown in conjunction with this tasking. The Squadron ended its Caribbean tour on 24 March 1944 when it was transferred back to the United States and became a B-25 Mitchell Operational Training Unit at Alamogordo Army Air Field, New Mexico.   On 20 June 1944, the 12th Bombardment Squadron was disbanded.

Strategic Air Command
"Eleven years later, on [1 September] 1955, the 12th Bombardment Squadron, Medium, was activated at Abilene Air Force Base, Texas. Before being inactivated once more in 1961, the 12th’s Boeing B-47 Stratojets engaged in training.."

Intercontinental ballistic missile squadron
Organized on 1 March 1962 as the 12th Strategic Missile Squadron, an intercontinental ballistic missile squadron assigned to the 341st Missile Wing at Malmstrom Air Force Base, Montana.  Initially equipped with 50 LGM-30A Minuteman Is in early 1962.   "Upon organization, it became the second Minuteman ICBM squadron in the Air Force. During the mid-1960s the 12th replaced its 50 Minuteman I missiles with Minuteman IIs. The 12th was the first squadron at Malmstrom to undergo weapon system upgrade to Minuteman Mod; and on [22 April] 1967, it was the first squadron to become fully operational with the new Minuteman II missiles under this program. The 12th was also the first squadron in the wing to undergo silo upgrade. By 1978, the Improved Launch Control System had replaced the Minuteman Mod system and the 12th SMS once again had the state-of-the-art weapon system."

"In 1994, the 12 reorganized under the objective squadron concept. This reorganization took the three combat disciplines, ICBM operations, security police, and electromechanical maintenance, and combined them under the "one hat" of the missile squadron commander. In early June 1995, electromechanical Maintenance returned to the 341st Logistics Group."

The 12th Missile Squadron led the way in removing Minuteman II missiles and replacing them with LGM-30G Minuteman III silos from the inactivating 321st Missile Wing at Grand Forks Air Force Base, North Dakota in 1996; Minuteman IIs being retired.  The new missile enhances capability, increases flexibility, and marks yet another system upgrade.

Lineage
 Constituted as the 12th Bombardment Squadron (Heavy) on 22 December 1939
 Activated on 1 February 1940
 Redesignated 12th Bombardment Squadron (Medium) on 7 May 1942
 Redesignated 12th Bombardment Squadron, Medium on 21 September 1943
 Disbanded on 20 June 1944
 Reconstituted and redesignated 12th Bombardment Squadron, Light on 10 March 1947
 Activated in the reserve on 24 July 1947
 Inactivated on 27 June 1949
 Redesignated 12th Bombardment Squadron, Medium on 7 June 1955
 Activated on 1 September 1955
 Discontinued and inactivated on 25 June 1961
 Redesignated 12th Strategic Missile Squadron (ICBM-Minuteman) and activated on 22 September 1961 (not organized)
 Organized on 1 March 1962
 Redesignated 12th Missile Squadron on 1 September 1991

Assignments
 25th Bombardment Group, 1 February 1940 – 20 June 1944 (under operational control of Antilles Air Task Force and VI Fighter Command, 1 November 1942 – 20 June 1944)
 341st Bombardment Group, 24 July 1947 – 27 June 1949
 341st Bombardment Wing, 1 September 1955 – 25 June 1961
 Strategic Air Command, 22 September 1961 (not organized)
 341st Strategic Missile Wing, 1 March 1962
 341st Operations Group, 1 September 1991 – present

Stations
 Langley Field, Virginia, 1 February – 26 October 1940
 Borinquen Field, Puerto Rico, 1 November 1940
 Benedict Field, St Croix, c. 8 November 1941
 Dakota Field, Aruba, c. 10 October 1942
 Detachment operated from Borinquen Field, Puerto Rico, c. November 1942 – 23 November 1943
 Coolidge Field, Antigua, 23 November 1943 – 24 March 1944
 Alamogordo Army Air Field, New Mexico, 6 April – 20 June 1944
 Westover Field, Massachusetts, 24 July 1947
 Bradley Field, Connecticut, 24 October 1947 – 27 June 1949
 Abilene Air Force Base (later Dyess Air Force Base), Texas, 1 September 1955 – 25 June 1961
 Deployed at Andersen Air Force Base, Guam, 9 January – c. 4 April 1958
 Malmstrom Air Force Base, Montana, 1 March 1962 – present

Aircraft and missiles
 Douglas B-18 Bolo, 1940–1944
 North American B-25 Mitchell, 1943–1944
 North American AT-6 Texan, 1947–1949
 Beechcraft AT-11 Kansan, 1947–1949
 Boeing B-47 Stratojet, 1956–1961
 LGM-30A/B Minuteman I, 1962–1968
 LGM-30F Minuteman II, 1968–1991
 LGM-30G Minuteman III, 1996 – present

Awards and campaigns

See also

 List of United States Air Force missile squadrons

References

Notes
 Explanatory notes

 Citations

Bibliography

External links
 
 

012
Military units and formations in Montana